Aeger tipularius is a species of fossil prawn from the Solnhofen limestone.

References

Dendrobranchiata
Crustaceans described in 1822
Prehistoric crustaceans